Zarya may refer to:
Zorya, personification of dawn in Slavic mythology
Zarya (antenna), a type of medium-wave broadcasting antenna used in former Soviet Union
Zarya (ISS module) is a module of the International Space Station.
Zarya (magazine), a Slavophile 1869–1872 magazine
Zarya (non-magnetic ship), a Soviet research ship built in 1953 and used to research Earth's magnetic field
Zarya (opera), an 1877 opera by Ella Adayevskaya
Zarya (Overwatch), a player character from the video games Overwatch and Heroes of the Storm
Zarya (polar ship), a Russian research ship sent to the Arctic during 1900–1902
Zarya (publication), a Marxist publication
Zarya, Russia, several rural localities in Russia
Zarya Moonwolf, a main character in Nickelodeon's show Mysticons
Zarya (space capsule), the name of a late 1980s project for a Soyuz spacecraft replacement
Zarya Voroshilovgrad, former name of FC Zorya Luhansk, a Ukrainian soccer team

See also
Zaria (disambiguation)
Zorya (disambiguation)